= Frozen Run (West Virginia) =

Stream in West Virginia, U.S.

Coordinates: 38°44′13″N 81°02′08″W

Frozen Run is a stream in the U.S. state of West Virginia.

Frozen Run was named for an incident when an early settler nearly froze while sleeping near the stream until he wrapped himself in a recently killed buffalo's skin. The next morning, he had to be thawed out of it.

== See also ==
- List of rivers of West Virginia
